, also called , is a part of the traditional Noh theatre in Japan.

The name refers to the vocal section of the music associated with classical Noh drama.  Yōkyoku is sung by the chorus and rarely by the other actors. It usually consists of references to classical texts or Buddhist sutras and are 
composed in groups of five and seven syllables.

These vocalizations, as well as the performance of accompanying instruments, help to produce a multitude of supernatural and celestial sounds that are intrinsic to the Noh music genre.

It has two basic styles:

Kotoba: words/heightened speech
Fushi: melody

References
Frederic, Louis (2002). "Japan Encyclopedia." Cambridge, Massachusetts: Harvard University Press.

Noh
Japanese styles of music
Vocal music
Japanese traditional music